Goodger may refer to:

People

Ben Goodger
Eddie Goodger
Lauren Goodger (born 1986), English television personality

Places
Goodger, Queensland, a locality in the South Burnett Region, Queensland, Australia